Westmount was a former provincial electoral district located in the Montreal region of Quebec, Canada.

It corresponded to the city of Westmount in Montreal.

It was created for the 1912 election from Montréal–Saint-Georges.  It disappeared in the 1939 election and its successor election was Westmount–Saint-Georges. However, Westmount–Saint-Georges disappeared in the 1966 election and its successor electoral district was the re-created Westmount.  Westmount's final election was in 1989.  It disappeared for good in the 1994 election.

Members of the Legislative Assembly / National Assembly

References
 Election results (National Assembly)
 Election results (QuebecPolitique.com)

Former provincial electoral districts of Quebec
Westmount, Quebec